Rajanews is an Iranian news site. The website is known to have ties with the Front of Islamic Revolution Stability, and as such has a hardline stance.

References

Iranian news websites
Creative Commons-licensed websites